Ferras Alqaisi (born July 2, 1982) is an American singer-songwriter from Los Angeles, California. He is well known for his single "Hollywood's Not America" from his debut album Aliens & Rainbows, which was featured as the exit song during the semi-final round of American Idol season 7. He is signed with Unsub Records, a subsidiary of Capitol Records founded by Katy Perry, being the first artist to sign with her label. In June 2014 he released his self-titled EP through the label.

Early life and education

Ferras was born in 1982 in Illinois. After his parents divorced when he was an early age, his father promised him a trip to Disneyland and instead took him back to Amman, Jordan, his father's homeland. His mother eventually succeeded in bringing him back to the United States, eventually moving to Southern California. He also attended the Berklee College of Music in Boston, Massachusetts.

Career

Ferras' career began when he was in Amman with his father. He practiced music on a small keyboard that his father gave him and began to write his own songs. Ferras credits the keyboard for helping him through a lonely time while he was in Jordan. He was 17 when he decided to pursue a career in music, after listening to pop artists such as Britney Spears and 'N Sync. After submitting a demo tape, he was invited to Florida where he signed with a manager and moved to Los Angeles. He performed as Elton John in the reality television Performing As... and was introduced to Fred Durst by the show's vocal coach. Ferras was signed by Durst prior to joining the Berklee College of Music. He was eventually signed to EMI's Capitol Records after an audition for the label's chairman Jason Flom while on spring break.

In April 2008, Ferras released his major record label debut with Aliens & Rainbows via Capitol Records. The album was produced by The Matrix and Gary Clark. The album features the lead single "Hollywood's Not America," which was used as the "exit song" during the semi-final round of the seventh season of the American reality series American Idol before being replaced by a single from Ruben Studdard. The choice gave Ferras a moderate amount of exposure and publicity for the song, which peaked at No. 62 on the Billboard Hot 100. He also performed the song during his first national television performance on The Today Show.

Ferras released an independent EP entitled "Interim" on July 2, 2010.  The EP consisted of five original acoustic songs recorded as a live performance in a studio setting.

The year 2010 was also a big year for his songwriting. He co-wrote the song "Aftermath" for Adam Lambert's debut CD For Your Entertainment. In late September 2010, the song was a #1 single in Finland. In June 2010, Australian singer Michael Paynter released the song "Love the Fall" featuring The Veronicas which was co-written by Ferras and Gary Clark. It became the most added song to Australian radio in the first week of July and was the first top-20 single on the ARIA chart for Paynter, and was later certified Platinum.

Ferras continued concentrating on songwriting and in January 2011, German singer Lena Meyer-Landrut performed the song "Good News" which was co-written by Ferras and Audra Mae for the Eurovision Song Contest 2011. Four tracks co-written by Ferras were also included on the Ricky Martin record "Musica+Alma+Sexo" which was released on February 1, 2011. Ferras co-wrote the song "Galaxy" with Richard Vission and was released as a duet by Australian recording artists Jessica Mauboy and Stan Walker in 2011. The song was released digitally in October 2011 as the fifth single from Mauboy's second studio album. It peaked at number 13 on the Aria Singles Chart and number seven on the Aria Urban Singles Chart. It was certified platinum by the Australian Recording Industry Association (ARIA) for selling over 70,000 digital copies.  "Galaxy" also debuted at number 40 on the New Zealand Singles Chart.

Ferras released his self-titled EP on June 17, 2014, after becoming the first artist to sign with Katy Perry's Metamorphosis Music. He had first met Perry in 2007 when both were artists at Capitol Records. The first single of the album is titled "Speak in Tongues". The album also features a ballad called "Legends Never Die", which is a duet with Ferras and Perry. The EP contains a total of five songs and was released on iTunes. It was also announced that Ferras would be appearing as the support artist on the North American leg and in some shows in the Asian leg of Perry's Prismatic World Tour.

In July 2014, he was picked as Elvis Duran's Artist of the Month and was featured on NBC's Today show hosted by Kathy Lee Gifford and Hoda Kotb, where he performed his single "Speak in Tongues" live.

Discography

Studio albums

Extended plays

Singles

Songwriting credits

References

External links
 Official Ferras website

1982 births
Living people
American pop rock singers
American pop pianists
American male pianists
Singers from Illinois
People from Macoupin County, Illinois
American people of Jordanian descent
Unsub Records artists
21st-century American singers
21st-century American pianists
21st-century American male singers